Ardmore is an unincorporated community in Prince George's County, Maryland, United States.

Ardmore was the name given to the railroad depot in the opening sequences set in Maryland, of the 1956 movie Giant.

References

Unincorporated communities in Prince George's County, Maryland
Unincorporated communities in Maryland